"Somebody's Gonna Love You" is a song written by Rafe Van Hoy and Don Cook, and recorded by American country music artist Lee Greenwood.  It was released in July 1983 as the second single and title track from the album Somebody's Gonna Love You.  The song was Greenwood's sixth country hit and the first of his seven number ones on the country chart.  The single went to number one for a week and spent a total of thirteen weeks on the country chart.

Chart performance

References
 

Lee Greenwood songs
1983 singles
Songs written by Don Cook
MCA Records singles
Songs written by Rafe Van Hoy
Song recordings produced by Jerry Crutchfield
1983 songs